Manson Family Vacation is a 2015 American comedy film written and directed by J. Davis. The film stars Jay Duplass, Linas Phillips, Leonora Pitts, Adam Chernick and Tobin Bell. The film was released on October 6, 2015, by The Orchard.

Cast

Jay Duplass as Nick
Linas Phillips as Conrad
Leonora Pitts as Amanda
Adam Chernick as Max
Tobin Bell as Blackbird
Davie-Blue as Sunshine
Suzanne Ford as Janice
Ray Laska as Frank
Brent Alan Henry as Officer Phiffer
Matt Bennett as Buddy Holly
Justin M. Rasch as Skullface
Jonathan Brooks as Rockabilly

Release
The film premiered at South by Southwest on March 16, 2015. Shortly after, Netflix acquired distribution rights to the film. In June 2015, The Orchard acquired distribution rights to the film. The film was released on video on demand on October 6, 2015. It was released on Netflix on October 27, 2015.

Critical reception
Manson Family Vacation received positive reviews from film critics. It holds a 93% approval rating on review aggregator website Rotten Tomatoes, based on 15 reviews, with an average rating of 6.9/10.

Justin Chang of Variety gave the film a positive review writing: "It’s a measure of the film’s dramatic balance as well as its emotional integrity that both of these men will wind up eliciting the viewer’s sympathy and scorn at different points, so that by the end of 'Manson Family Vacation,' we have arrived alongside them at a crucial point of transition and understanding — not the most surprising destination, perhaps, but one that feels entirely earned."

References

External links
 

2015 films
2015 comedy films
American comedy films
Duplass Brothers Productions films
The Orchard (company) films
Films about vacationing
2010s English-language films
2010s American films